Wintersmith is the twenty-second studio album by British folk rock band Steeleye Span. It was released in October 2013. It features the line-up of Maddy Prior, Peter Knight, Rick Kemp, Julian Littman, Pete Zorn and Liam Genockey. Guest musicians are Terry Pratchett (voice), Kathryn Tickell (Northumbrian pipes), Bob Johnson (vocals), and John Spiers (melodeon).

The songs on the album were inspired principally by Wintersmith and other Discworld books featuring Tiffany Aching. There is a spoken contribution by the author, Terry Pratchett.

A double CD Deluxe Edition was released in October 2014: the second disc featured a mixture of new tracks, live performances and demos.

Personnel
Steeleye Span
Maddy Prior – vocals
Peter Knight – violin, vocals (except CD2, tracks 1-4)
Jessie May Smart – violin on "deluxe version" CD2, tracks 1 to 4
Rick Kemp – bass, vocals
Julian Littman – guitar, piano, vocals
Pete Zorn – acoustic guitar, saxophone, vocals
Liam Genockey – drums, percussion

with:
John Spiers – melodeon
Kathryn Tickell – Northumbrian pipes
Bob Johnson – vocals
Terry Pratchett – voice (spoken word)

Tracks

2013 Standard Edition 
"Overture"
"The Dark Morris Song"
"Wintersmith"
"You"
"The Good Witch" – featuring Terry Pratchett (spoken word)
"Band of Teachers"
"The Wee Free Men"
"Hiver"
"Fire & Ice"
"The Making of a Man"
"Crown of Ice"
"First Dance"
"The Dark Morris Tune"
"The Summer Lady"
"Ancient Eyes"
"We Shall Wear Midnight"

2014 Deluxe Edition 

Tracks - Deluxe Edition Disc 2:

"To Be Human"
"Be Careful What You Wish for"
"Granny Aching"
"Just One Heart"
"You" (live)
"Ancient Eyes" (live)
"The Dark Morris Tune" (live)
"The Dark Morris Song" (live)
"The Making of a Man" (live)
"Crown of Ice" (live)
"Summer Lady" (live)
"We Shall Wear Midnight" (live)
"Ancient Eyes" (demo)
"The Wee Free Men" (demo)

Chart performance

Wintersmith debuted at No. 77 on the UK Albums Chart.

Critical reception

The album received very positive reviews and has been described as "a marriage between the written word and music that is devastatingly superb."

Folk Radio UK hailed the release as "a concept album it has that feel of being made for a stage production".

References

Steeleye Span albums
2013 albums
Albums produced by Chris Tsangarides
Discworld
Adaptations of works by Terry Pratchett
Concept albums